Godmanchester Eastside Common is a  biological Site of Special Scientific Interest east of Godmanchester in Cambridgeshire. The site is registered common land.

There are two fields, with a disused railway line separating them. The habitats are calcareous loam and calcareous clay, both of which are unusual, and there are diverse grass species, such as crested hair-grass and meadow oat grass. The southern field has lines of medieval ridge and furrow.

There is access from Common Lane.

References

Sites of Special Scientific Interest in Cambridgeshire
Godmanchester